Banatsko Aranđelovo is a village located in the Novi Kneževac municipality, in the North Banat District of Serbia. It is situated in the Autonomous Province of Vojvodina. The village has a Serb ethnic majority (53.08%) with a present Hungarian (26.54%) and Romani minority (15.13%). It has a population of 1,718 people (2002 census).

Name

In Serbian, the village is known as Banatsko Aranđelovo or Банатско Аранђелово (formerly also Oroslamoš / Оросламош), in Hungarian as Oroszlámos, and in Croatian as Banatsko Aranđelovo. Current village name comes from words "Banat" and "saint archangel Gabriel" ("arhangel Gavrilo" or simply "Aranđel" in Serbian) and means "the place of saint archangel Gabriel in Banat".

Historical population

1961: 3,700
1971: 3,144
1981: 2,245
1991: 1,912

See also
List of places in Serbia
List of cities, towns and villages in Vojvodina

References
Slobodan Ćurčić, Broj stanovnika Vojvodine, Novi Sad, 1996.

External links
Banatsko Aranđelovo
Banatsko Aranđelovo
Banatsko Aranđelovo

Populated places in Serbian Banat
Populated places in North Banat District
Novi Kneževac